The Third Ikeda Cabinet is the 60th Cabinet of Japan headed by Hayato Ikeda from December 9, 1963 to November 9, 1964.

Cabinet

Reshuffled Cabinet 
A Cabinet reshuffle took place on July 18, 1964.

References 

Cabinet of Japan
1963 establishments in Japan
Cabinets established in 1963
Cabinets disestablished in 1964